

History

18th and 19th centuries

Early historical events, settlement and incorporation
While several American Indian tribes are known to have lived in the area occupied by present-day Lake Charles, the first European colonizers arrived in the 1760s. 

In 1781 Martin LeBleu and his wife, Dela Marion, of Bordeaux, France were the first recorded Europeans to colonize the area now known as the LeBleu Settlement. Charles Sallier, one of the first colonizers, married LeBleu's daughter, Catherine LeBleu; the Salliers built their home on the beach in what is current-day Lake Charles. The area on the east side of the Calcasieu River was defined as the southern part of the "Neutral Ground" until ratification of the Adams-Onís Treaty that was ratified in 1821. The infamous pirate, Jean Lafitte, once delivered stolen slaves and contraband to James Bowie and other enslavers in the area. By 1860 the area become known as Charles Town in Sallier's honor.

The Rio Hondo, which flowed through Lake Charles, was later called Quelqueshue, a Native American term meaning "Crying Eagle". Transliterated through French, this became the name of Calcasieu Parish. On March 7, 1861, Lake Charles was officially incorporated as the town of Charleston, Louisiana.

Industrial growth and the Civil War
The city's growth was fairly slow until Captain Daniel Goos, a Frisian by birth, came to the city in 1855. Goos established a lumber mill and schooner dock, in what became known as Goosport. He promoted a profitable trade with Texan and Mexican ports by sending his schooner downriver into the Gulf of Mexico. Until the arrival of Goos, a man named Jacob Ryan dominated the lumber industry. Between 1817 and 1855, timber sales from longleaf pine and bald cypress remained the city's primary source of economic revenue.

Jacob Ryan convinced the state government to move the parish seat to Lake Charles from its former location at Marion, a settlement about eight miles (13 km) upriver. Later that year, Ryan and Samuel Kirby transferred the parish courthouse and jail by barge to the then-named Charleston. Six years after the city was incorporated, dissatisfaction over the name Charleston arose; on March 16, 1867, Charleston, Louisiana, was renamed and incorporated as the town of Lake Charles.

By the time of the U.S. Civil War, many Americans from the North, along with a large influx of continental Europeans and Jews, had come to settle the area. Attitudes toward slavery in Lake Charles were mixed, as slavery was secondary to business interests. In fact, fewer than five percent of the population were slaves. Many citizens became involved in the war. Some local families supported the Confederacy, while others supported the cause of the Union.

After the Civil War
In the years following the Civil War, Lake Charles regained its status as a lumbering center. Especially in the 1880s, the city saw an increase in population and economic demand largely due to an innovative advertising campaign by J.B. Watkins. Thanks to this campaign, the city's population grew four-hundred percent during this decade.

Using the pine wood from the city's mills, construction of large Victorian mansions transformed Lake Charles during the 1890s.  Carpenters competed with verve to out-build each other with their use of elaborate fretwork and decoration. The area of present-day Lake Charles located just east of downtown is known as the Charpentier Historic District from the French word for carpenter and features unique homes from this era.

Lumber industry
In the early 1880s Michigan lumber tycoons, including R. H. Nason and N. B. Bradley, as well as William E. Ramsey (originally from Canada) had purchased large tracts of land in the area. In 1887 the "Bradley-Ramsey Lumber Company" was formed by the "Michigan Men" that included Ramsey, Nason, Bradley, Lewis Penoyer and Benton Hatchett, with over 150,000 acres. The company built two sawmills (Michigan mill and the Mt. Hope mill) in the area. The mill of J. A. Bel, a local businessman originally from New Orleans but in the area from youth, became the second largest.

1912
By 1912 the American Lumberman Equipment Register listed the J. A. Bel Lumber Company., Ltd, Calcasieu Long Leaf Lumber Company (Hdq. Long-Bell Lumber Co. Kansas City, Mo.), Hodge Fence & Lumber Company (machine shop and 12 miles of railroad), Lyons Lumber Company (also in Thicket, Texas) with 4 miles of railroad, and Powell Lumber Company with a machine shop.

Twentieth century

On April 23, 1910, a great fire, known as the Great Fire of 1910 devastated much of the city. The 1890 courthouse, along with most of downtown Lake Charles, was destroyed. Two months afterwards, the Louisiana legislature divided the former Imperial Calcasieu Parish into the current parishes of Allen, Beauregard, Cameron, Jefferson Davis and Calcasieu. However, Lake Charles soon rebuilt itself and continued to grow and expand.

After World War II, Lake Charles experienced industrial growth with the onset of the petrochemical refining industries. The Lake Charles Civic Center, built on reclaimed land on the lakefront in the 1970s, hosted many national shows, acts, and pop singers such as Elvis. The city grew to a high of some 80,000 people in the early 1980s, but with local economic recession, the population declined. With the advent of the gaming industry, the city has begun again to see growth. As of the 2000 census, the city had a total population of 71,757.

Present day

Lake Charles suffered extensive damage from Hurricane Rita, which struck the city as a Category 3 storm early September 24, 2005. On September 22, the mayor ordered a mandatory evacuation of the city, and approximately ninety percent of the residents left. Evacuees were asked to not return for 48 hours, due to wind and flood damage. There was extensive damage to the city's electrical grid, and many areas did not have power restored for up to three weeks.

The United States Coast Guard was called in to contain the spilled oil, which had by this time flowed down the Calcasieu River. Because of the disaster, the Coast Guard had to close many waterways, including the Calcasieu River Channel and a one-mile (1.6 km) stretch of the Gulf Intracoastal Waterway. The Port of Lake Charles remained closed for some time after the accident due to contamination.

Oil prices surged to over $74 per barrel in part due to the Citgo spillage. The Calcasieu Refining Co., which normally processes  of oil a day, was working at low levels for weeks after the incident.

As part of the city's recovery from Hurricane Rita, elected officials proposed a plan to renovate the downtown area to make it more attractive and pedestrian-friendly. A primary concern for the downtown revitalization was to include quality and affordable housing.  To fund that proposal, officials proposed a city-wide bond issue. To date, about one third of the 90-million dollar bond proposal has been spent. The Lakefront Promenade is currently under construction, as is the 52-berth marina just south of the Civic Center grounds. The monies issued from the bond will also be used for other capital projects throughout the city.

In 2008, a report showed that overall criminal offenses were down 15%, and major crimes were down 9% in the city.

In 2020, the city was heavily damaged again by Category 4 Hurricane Laura. Many homes were damaged or destroyed and the Capitol One Building was heavily damaged, with many of its windows being blown out.

References

Lake Charles
Lake Charles, Louisiana